Gastón Faber (born 21 April 1996) is an Uruguayan footballer who plays as a midfielder for Juventud de Las Piedras.

Honours 
Danubio F.C.
Winner
 Uruguayan Primera División: 2013–14
Uruguay U-23
Pan American Games: 
Champion : 2015

References

External links 
 

1996 births
Living people
Footballers from Montevideo
Association football midfielders
Uruguayan footballers
Uruguayan expatriate footballers
Uruguay youth international footballers
Uruguay under-20 international footballers
Danubio F.C. players
Racing Club de Montevideo players
Calcio Foggia 1920 players
Boston River players
Juventud de Las Piedras players
Uruguayan Primera División players
Uruguayan Segunda División players
Serie C players
2015 South American Youth Football Championship players
Pan American Games gold medalists for Uruguay
Footballers at the 2015 Pan American Games
Pan American Games medalists in football
Uruguayan expatriate sportspeople in Italy
Uruguayan expatriate sportspeople in Ecuador
Expatriate footballers in Italy
Expatriate footballers in Ecuador
Medalists at the 2015 Pan American Games
Expatriate footballers in Spain
Uruguayan expatriate sportspeople in Spain
CD Tudelano footballers
Primera Federación players